Demir Ege Tıknaz (born 17 August 2004) is a Turkish footballer who plays as a midfielder for Beşiktaş.

Career

Tıknaz started his career with Turkish top flight side Beşiktaş.
He has accepted a scholarship to play basketball for the UCLA BRUINS.

References

External links

 

2004 births
Association football midfielders
Beşiktaş J.K. footballers
Footballers from Istanbul
Living people
Turkey youth international footballers
Turkish footballers